The following highways in Virginia have been known as State Route 17:
 State Route 17 (Virginia 1918-1933), Troutville to Gordonsville
 U.S. Route 17 in Virginia, 1926 - present
 State Route 17 (Virginia 1933), 1933 - mid-1960s, now U.S. Route 17 from Falmouth to Winchester